Nobonyad Metro Station  is one of the main stations of Line 3 of Tehran Metro, located on Nobonyad Square at the interface of Sadr and Babayi Highways in Northern Tehran. It has been designed and built by Boland Payeh Company as a project within a barter portfolio.
With the presence of Dr.Maziyar Hosseini, Transportation and Traffic Deputy of Tehran Municipality, Mr. Habil Darvishi, Managing Director of Tehran Metro Company and Mr. Behrouz Nouri Khajavi, CEO of Boland Payeh Co., Southern Entrance of Nobonyad Station is opened to public on February 6, 2017.

References

Tehran Metro stations
Railway stations opened in 2015
2015 establishments in Iran